Governors Athletic F.C. are a football club from the Isle of Man. They compete in the Isle of Man Football League and they wear a red and white striped kit. They currently play their home games at Station Fields in Colby.

History

Governors Athletic were founded in 2014. For their first season they played their home matches at Nobles Park in Douglas. For the 2015–16 season, Governors Athletic secured the new 3G pitch at Bemahague and played first official league game there on 15 August 2015.

The first team achieved its first victory on 10 September 2016, with a 1–0 victory against Michael United A.F.C. A 94th-minute goal from Andrew Zola Ronan sealed the win.

In the 2020–21 season Governors moved to the south of the island to play at Station Fields in Colby. Governors had their best season to date with both senior teams finishing in mid-table positions breaking records from previous seasons including a record 17-0 win against Pulrose United. Governors also changed sponsors for this season and will be sponsored by Express Fixings & Fittings (Home kit) & Quirk Brothers painters & decorators (Away Kit)

Records and statistics

Highest League Position: 10th, 2020–21

Most Points in a season: 25, 2020–21

Biggest Victory: First Team 17-0 vs Pulrose United, 2020–21

Teams and staff

Senior Teams

Governors Athletic First Team

Governors Athletic Combination Team

Governors Athletic Masters Team

Governors Athletic Walking Football Team

Junior Team

Governors Athletic Under 8’s Junior Team (Young Govs)

Football Staff

First Team Manager: Peter Corrin

Combination Manager: Matthew Molesworth

Masters Manager: Simon Hampson

Chairman: Karl Hunter

Club Captain: Michael Glennon

Junior Coaches: Karl Hunter & Michael Glennon

Social media

Facebook - Governors Athletic FC

Twitter- @GovernorsAFC

Instagram - Governors Athletic FC

References

Football clubs in the Isle of Man
Association football clubs established in 2014
2014 establishments in the Isle of Man